Tonante, initially called Ao Rei dos Violões Limitada (To the King of Acoustic Guitars in English), is a Brazilian guitar manufacturing company founded in 1954 by the Portuguese brothers Abel and Samuel Tonante, who artisanelly built musical instruments, thirteen years after their arrival in the country.

Tonante is well known for making highly affordable stringed instruments in Brazil, together with companies such as Giannini, Del Vecchio and Di Giorgio. Tonante's range of products include electric and acoustic guitars, banjos and cavaquinhos.

History 
During the military dictatorship in Brazil, import substitution policies forbade or restricted imports, which led local manufacturers (like Tonante guitars) to achieve a dominant market position. Tonante guitars were notable for being cheaper than other local competitors such as Giannini, Snake or Finch electric guitars which made it one of the most popular stringed instruments manufacturer in Brazil.

Models 
Guitar models manufactured by Tonante includes:

 Finder: a cheap mix between a Fender Stratocaster and a Fender Jazzmaster;
 Erton: a Fender Stratocaster copy;
 Starlight: a heavy metal guitars with a vibrola system derived from the Floyd Rose and three single coil pickups, with a body similar to the Finder;
 Les Paul: a flat top Gibson Les Paul copy;
 Banjoes, acoustic guitars and cavaquinhos;
 Various cavaquinhos, mandolins and acoustic guitars.

Cult status 
Although early Tonante instruments were plagued by low quality electronics, rough, uncomfortable shapes and bad finish, they have attained cult status due to their historical significance. A vintage Tonante guitar can be worth as much as R$170 (approximately $).

References 

Guitar manufacturing companies
Musical instrument manufacturing companies of Brazil
Brazilian brands